Österhaninge is an urban area located within Haninge Municipality in Stockholm County, Sweden. It is the birthplace of former Prime Minister of Sweden Fredrik Reinfeldt, black metal frontman and vocalist Dead (Per Yngve Ohlin) hockey player Kristian Huselius.

References 

Populated places in Haninge Municipality